Fauriellidae is a family of thrips belonging to the order Thysanoptera.

Genera:
 Fauriella Hood, 1937
 Opisthothrips Hood, 1937
 Parrellathrips Mound & Marullo, 1998
 Ropotamothrips Pelikan, 1958

References

Thrips